Munisha Mahajan Rajpal is an Indian story, screenplay and dialogue writer currently writing for Yeh Rishta Kya Kehlata Hai and Shaurya Aur Anokhi Ki Kahani on Star Plus.

Career 

She writes both fiction and Non-fiction and worked for the shows Yeh Rishta Kya Kehlata Hai, Shree, Saas Bina Sasural, Ek Packet Umeed, Dekha Ek Khwaab, Meet Mila De Rabba, Kashi – Ab Na Rahe Tera Kagaz Kora, Jasuben Jayantilaal Joshi Ki Joint Family, Hum Dono Hain Alag Alag.

She also works as a writer for dubbing scripts for films.

Currently she is writing dialogues for Yeh Rishta Kya Kehlata Hai and Shaurya Aur Anokhi Ki Kahani.

Filmography

Television writer
 Ek Packet Umeed
 Jasuben Jayantilaal Joshi Ki Joint Family
 Meet Mila De Rabba
 Kashi – Ab Na Rahe Tera Kagaz Kora
 Shree
 Hum Dono Hain Alag Alag
 Saas Bina Sasural
 Dekha Ek Khwaab
 Yeh Ishq Hai
 Yeh Rishta Kya Kehlata Hai (2009–present)
 Shaurya Aur Anokhi Ki Kahani (2021–present)

Awards

References

External links

Living people
Indian television writers
1973 births
Indian women television writers
21st-century Indian women writers
21st-century Indian dramatists and playwrights
People from Pathankot district
Women writers from Punjab, India
Screenwriters from Punjab, India
21st-century Indian screenwriters